Enippeas is a former municipality in the Larissa regional unit, Thessaly, Greece. Since the 2011 local government reform it is part of the municipality Farsala, of which it is a municipal unit. Population 3,213 (2011). The municipal unit has an area of 161.252 km2. The seat of the municipality was in Mega Evydrio.

References

Populated places in Larissa (regional unit)